Renato Prono (born 2 March 1991) is a Paraguayan swimmer. He competed in the men's 50 metre breaststroke event at the 2017 World Aquatics Championships. In 2019, he represented Paraguay at the World Aquatics Championships held in Gwangju, South Korea and he competed in the men's 50 metre breaststroke and men's 100 metre breaststroke events.

References

External links
 

1991 births
Living people
Paraguayan male swimmers
Male breaststroke swimmers
Place of birth missing (living people)
South American Games silver medalists for Paraguay
South American Games medalists in swimming
Competitors at the 2018 South American Games
Pan American Games competitors for Paraguay
Swimmers at the 2011 Pan American Games
Swimmers at the 2015 Pan American Games
Swimmers at the 2019 Pan American Games
Competitors at the 2013 Summer Universiade
Tennessee Volunteers men's swimmers
21st-century Paraguayan people